Alberto Ricchetti (born 26 May 1985) is an Italian sprint canoer who competed at the 2008 and 2016 Olympics. In 2008 he finished fourth the K-4 1000 m event. In 2016 he placed 13th–14th in the K-2 200 m and K-4 1000 m events and failed to reach the K-1 1000 m final.

References

1985 births
Canoeists at the 2008 Summer Olympics
Canoeists at the 2016 Summer Olympics
Italian male canoeists
Living people
Olympic canoeists of Italy